Tarik Sektioui (born 13 May 1977) is a Moroccan former professional footballer who played as a right winger, currently the manager of Union de Touarga.

He spent most of his professional career in the Netherlands and Portugal, amassing Eredivisie totals of 142 games and 29 goals over the course of eight seasons for Willem II, AZ Alkmaar and RKC in the former, and winning several honours with Porto in the latter.

A full international for Morocco, Sektioui represented the side at the 2008 Africa Cup of Nations. He later managed several Botola clubs.

Playing career

Club
Born in Fez, Sektioui played two seasons at French club AJ Auxerre, failing to establish with the first team and also appearing sparingly for the reserves during his spell. He arrived at the Netherlands and Tilburg's Willem II in January 2000 from Swiss side Neuchâtel Xamax, going on to play a major role and eventually gaining captaincy.

In the 2004–05 campaign, Sektioui switched to AZ Alkmaar thus returning to the Eredivisie. During his two-year tenure, he scored some vital goals and formed an efficient attacking partnership with Shota Averladze.

After an uneventful loan stint in 1999 with C.S. Marítimo, Sektioui returned to Portugal in July 2006 after Co Adriaanse (also his coach at Willem II) signed him for FC Porto. He would find the adjustment difficult, and spent the second half of the season on loan to another Dutch team, RKC Waalwijk. On 3 February 2007, he played his first game, against NAC Breda.

Even though Adriaanse was gone, Sektioui was recalled for 2007–08, and was a key member of the squad coached by Jesualdo Ferreira that retained the Primeira Liga title with five matches remaining. On the fourth day of the group stage of the UEFA Champions League, he scored arguably the best goal of the night after overtaking five Olympique de Marseille defenders before hitting home beyond the goalkeeper; Porto eventually reached the round-of-16, ousted by Schalke 04 on penalties.

On 2 July 2009, after having featured rarely for Porto during the campaign – 17 appearances all competitions comprised – Sektioui moved to Ajman Club in the United Arab Emirates, on a one-year deal. He retired after one season aged 33, but later went back on his decision and joined his very first professional club, his hometown's MAS Fez.

International
A Moroccan international since 2001, Sektioui represented his nation in the 2008 Africa Cup of Nations, scoring a penalty in the 5–1 rout of Namibia.

Managerial career
After coaching at the Mohammed VI Football Academy, Sektioui was hired on a three-year deal at MAS Fez, after Azzedine Aït Djoudi left for JS Kabylie. After a spell at Wydad AC he returned to his relegated local club for two years in July 2016. On 20 November, he won the Moroccan Throne Cup with a 2–1 victory over Olympic Club de Safi in the final in Laayoune.

In February 2019, Sektioui moved to Moghreb Tétouan on an 18-month deal for a salary of 120,000 Moroccan dirhams. The northern club was ranked in 14th. He was dismissed in July for undisclosed breach of contract.

Sektioui signed a two-year deal at RS Berkane in September 2019. On 25 October of the following year, his team won the CAF Confederation Cup with a 1–0 win over Egypt's Pyramids FC in the final in Rabat. He resigned on 7 March 2021 after a 2–1 defeat to AS FAR.

He moved to his first foreign managerial job at newly promoted UAE Pro League side Emirates Club for the 2021–22 season. He resigned on 27 December, having taken one point in 12 games for the last-placed club.

In 2022, Sektioui returned to his country's top flight, at Union de Touarga.

Personal life
Sektioui's older brother, Abdelhadi, was also a footballer and manager. He was employed by MAS Fez in both roles too.

Honours

Player

Porto
Primeira Liga: 2006–07, 2007–08, 2008–09
Taça de Portugal: 2008–09
Supertaça Cândido de Oliveira: 2006

MAS Fez
CAF Confederation Cup: 2011

Manager

MAS Fez 
Moroccan Throne Cup: 2016

RS Berkane
CAF Confederation Cup: 2019–20

References

External links

PortuGOAL profile

1977 births
Living people
People from Fez, Morocco
Moroccan footballers
Moroccan football managers
Association football wingers
Botola players
Maghreb de Fès players
Ligue 1 players
AJ Auxerre players
Primeira Liga players
C.S. Marítimo players
FC Porto players
Swiss Super League players
Neuchâtel Xamax FCS players
Eredivisie players
Willem II (football club) players
AZ Alkmaar players
RKC Waalwijk players
UAE Pro League players
Ajman Club players
Morocco under-20 international footballers
Morocco international footballers
2008 Africa Cup of Nations players
Moroccan expatriate footballers
Expatriate footballers in France
Expatriate footballers in Portugal
Expatriate footballers in Switzerland
Expatriate footballers in the Netherlands
Expatriate footballers in the United Arab Emirates
Moroccan expatriate sportspeople in France
Moroccan expatriate sportspeople in Portugal
Moroccan expatriate sportspeople in Switzerland
Moroccan expatriate sportspeople in the Netherlands
Moroccan expatriate sportspeople in the United Arab Emirates
Botola managers
Maghreb de Fès managers
Moghreb Tétouan managers
RS Berkane managers
Emirates Club managers
UAE Pro League managers
Expatriate football managers in the United Arab Emirates